After the death of Assurbanipal in 631 BC, the Neo-Assyrian Empire entered a period of instability. This was the moment when the Babylonian ruler, Nabopolassar, led a revolt against Assyrian rule. After a few years of war, the Babylonians expelled the Assyrian forces from their territory.

The situation became highly dangerous for Assyria with the offensive of Cyaxares, king of the Medes, in 616 BC. The Median forces swiftly conquered Tarbisu and decisively defeated the Assyrian army at the Battle of Assur. Then, they joined the Babylonian army and launched a combined offensive against Nineveh in 612 BC.

After the Battle of Nineveh, where the Assyrian king Sin-Shar-Ishkun died, Ashur-uballit II became king and went to Harran with his remaining troops. But the Medes and the Babylonians besieged Harran and took the city, forcing Assur-Uballit II to flee to the Egyptian city of Carchemish with the remnants of his army. After Harran fell, Egyptians and the remnants of the Assyrian forces left Carchemish and attacked the Medes and the Babylonians garrisoned in Harran. However, this offensive failed.

References 

Harran
Harran
History of Şanlıurfa Province
Harran
Harran
Harran
Sieges of antiquity
Harran